Russell Williams may refer to:

Sportspeople
Russell Williams (footballer) (born 1974), former Australian rules footballer
Russell Williams (cyclist) (born 1961), English former road and track cyclist

Politicians
Russell Williams (politician) (born 1953), former politician in Quebec, Canada
T. Russell Williams (1869–1926), British socialist politician

Others
Russell Williams (criminal) (born 1963), Canadian convicted rapist and murderer and former Colonel in the Canadian Forces
Russ Williams (DJ) (born 1962), English radio DJ
Russell Williams II (born 1952), American sound mixer and two-time Oscar winner

See also
 Williams (surname)
 William Russell (disambiguation)